The International Arctic Science Committee (IASC) is a non-governmental organization which is composed of international science groups participating in arctic science research. IASC is an International Scientific Associate of ICSU, and was established in 1990. IASC's main aim is to initiate, develop, and coordinate leading edge scientific activity in the Arctic region, and on the role of the Arctic in the Earth system. It also provides objective and independent scientific advice to the Arctic Council and other organizations on issues of science affecting the management of the Arctic region. The decision-making organs of IASC are the Council and the Executive Committee. The day-to-day operations are supported by its secretariat headed by the executive secretary. IASC's geographical remit covers the Arctic Ocean and the surrounding landmasses.

Missions 
Since the founding of IASC, the scientific, environmental, economic and political realities of the North have changed dramatically. New problems and challenges ask for new or improved scientific knowledge. This increased need for knowledge of the arctic region has made international cooperation even more essential. In this light IASC has established five Working Groups (WG) that will identify scientific priorities and initiate and stimulate cross-disciplinary initiatives. The Working Groups are ‘living’ groups that rise and fall according to the scientific need of the community. The five Working Groups are:
 Terrestrial WG
 Cryosphere WG
 Marine/AOSB WG
 Atmosphere WG
 Social and Human WG
Arctic Science Summit Week (ASSW) The ASSW is an initiative of IASC and organized in cooperation with the Pacific Arctic Group (PAG), the International Arctic Social Sciences Association (IASSA), the European Polar Board (EPB), Association of Polar Early Career Scientists (APECS), the Arctic Council Indigenous Peoples' Secretariat (IPS), and the Forum of Arctic Research Operators (FARO). The purpose of the summit is to provide opportunities for coordination, collaboration and cooperation in all areas of arctic science, and to combine science and management meetings to save on travel and time. The ASSW also offers insight into arctic research undertaken by the host country. Together, IASC and SCAR (the Scientific Committee on Antarctic Research) will jointly host Polar2018, "Where the poles come together." Located in Davos (Switzerland), this meeting will combine SCAR and IASC Business Meetings, an Open Science Conference, the SCAR Delegates Meeting, and the Arctic Observing Summit.

Working Groups

The Atmosphere Working Group 
The Atmosphere working group is a working group within the International Arctic Science Committee. This working group is primarily concerned with how the Arctic is responding to the current global climate and what can be understood and even the predictability of what may transpire if the Arctic were to disappear. The atmosphere working group regards the work that it is conducting for the International Arctic Science Committee as a way to further promote science research within the Arctic region.

The Cryosphere Working Group
The cryosphere working group is the second working group at the International Arctic Science Committee. This working group differs from the atmosphere working group as it is concerned with the relationship of the different elements that make up the Arctic which includes the oceans, snow, ice sheets, and other elements that make up the Arctic region and how the current global climate may be affecting the cryosphere.

The Marine Working Group 
The Marine working group of the International Arctic Science Committee is the third of the current five working groups. The primary concern of the marine working group is the Arctic Ocean as well as the subarctic seas and how the effect of the current global climate will affect both the Arctic Ocean and seas but also how these changes may, in turn, affect the oceans and seas around the globe. The marine working group assesses the state of the Arctic ecosystem as well as the biology of the Arctic to gather a better understanding of how life functions in such a climate.

The Social and Human Working Group 
The fourth of the five working groups that are currently conducting research for the International Arctic Science Committee is the Social and Human working group. This working group differs from the other four working groups as they are primarily concerned with the social sciences aspect of arctic research. What this working group is concerned with involves the different groups within the Arctic and how they both interact with the Arctic as well as how changes to the Arctic climate will affect these individuals.

The Terrestrial Working Group 
The fifth and final current working group with the International Arctic Science Committee is the Terrestrial working group. This working group as indicated by the name is primarily concerned with the terrestrial as well as freshwater areas of the Arctic. The terrestrial working group tries to understand what was the previous Arctic system like, what is the status of the current Arctic climate, and how will it look in the future. Another aspect of the terrestrial working group involves how the changes of the Arctic climate will, in turn, affect the rest of the globe in the future.

Action Groups of The IASC
The IASC is also formed of two current Action Groups. The goal of these groups is to give advice on the long term and short term needs within the Arctic. These groups are often dismantled after a year or two.

Communicating Arctic Science to Policymakers
This action group of the international arctic science committee was established in 2017 to help relay the scientific data conducted by the working groups of the IASC to the policymakers around the globe. This action group provides advice and recommendations to policymakers so they are better able to understand the science being conducted within the Arctic.

Arctic Science and Business/Industry Cooperation
This action group is the second action group currently in operation for the International Arctic Science Committee. This action group is primarily concerned with the business and financial implications involving the Arctic and how businesses can facilitate Arctic Science and vice versa. These issues are discussed have been discussed recently at the 2017 Arctic Circle Assembly.

Other Groups of The IASC
There is currently one other group in operation by the International Arctic Science Committee. This group is classified as an action group, The Scoping Group on Indigenous Involvement is concerned with the involvement of indigenous groups in the Arctic. Using their traditions and knowledge of the Arctic to further arctic science research. The International Arctic Science Committee has the goal of making this scoping group into a full action group within the next few years.

Current Arctic Expeditions 
As of 2016, the International Arctic Science Committee has developed a year-round arctic expedition. The expedition which is known as The Multidisciplinary drifting Observatory for the Study of Arctic Climate or MOSAiC is the first year-round expedition of its kind. Heavily influenced by the expedition of Fridtjof Nansen during 1893–1896. The MOSAiC expedition will operate through 2019-2020 and will gather critical data to help gather scientific information regarding the Arctic and the impact of climate change.

The IASC and Moving Forward
The International Arctic Science Committee (IASC) as has been established is concerned with the scientific expeditions in the Arctic region. The IASC has developed many goals that wish to further connect both members of the International Arctic Science Committee and non-members of the IASC. The promotion of the Arctic as a space of peace is important for future research in the region as tensions among sovereign states could negatively impact future research that would give a greater understanding of the Arctic.

History 
IASC was founded in 1990 by representatives of national scientific organizations of the eight Arctic countries - Canada, Denmark, Finland, Iceland, Norway, Russia (at that time Union of Soviet Socialist Republics), Sweden and the United States of America. The Founding Articles of IASC were signed in Resolute Bay, Canada
Over the years, IASC has evolved into the leading international science organization of the North and its membership today includes 23 countries involved in all aspects of Arctic research, including 15 non-Arctic countries (Austria, China, the Czech Republic, France, Germany, India, Italy, Japan, the Netherlands, Poland, Portugal, South Korea, Spain, Switzerland and the UK).

While not an agent of peace like other international organizations, the International Arctic Science Committee has played a role. The role that the IASC has played in global politics is related to the need of cooperation among sovereign states. The organization was founded during the Cold War and has been seen as an area where tensions between the Soviet Union and The United States were diminished in the pursuit of scientific research. This allowed for the IASC to operate without the worry of tensions escalating and ruining the potential opportunity to study the Arctic and where scientists from around the globe could work together independent of state allegiance.

IASC Medal 
The medals are awarded "in recognition of exceptional and sustained contributions to understanding of the Arctic". The first medal was awarded in 2010. 

Information on the IASC Medal recipients from the IASC website  unless otherwise noted.

Council

See also 
 Arctic Climate Impact Assessment
 Arctic Council
 Arctic Cooperation and Politics

References

External links 
 IASC

Members of the International Council for Science
Scientific organisations based in Germany
Arctic research
Members of the International Science Council